Farhan Hairoddin is a Singaporean footballer who last played for Woodlands Wellington FC, primarily in the Prime League. 

On 23 November 2012, it was announced by Woodlands Wellington that he would not be retained for the 2013 season.

He made a total 6 appearances for the Rams, with 4 of those appearances as a substitute.

Club career statistics
 

All numbers encased in brackets signify substitute appearances.

References

1989 births
Living people
Singaporean footballers
Woodlands Wellington FC players
Singapore Premier League players
Association football defenders